Bellegrove is an unincorporated community in Allegany County, Maryland, United States.  The Old National Pike Milestones was listed on the National Register of Historic Places in 1975.

References

Unincorporated communities in Allegany County, Maryland
Unincorporated communities in Maryland